Jerry Goodman (born March 16, 1949) is an American violinist who played electric violin with The Flock and the jazz fusion ensemble Mahavishnu Orchestra.

Career
Jerry Goodman was born on March 16, 1949, in Chicago, Illinois. His parents were both members of the string section of the Chicago Symphony Orchestra, and his uncle was the noted composer and jazz pianist Marty Rubenstein. Jerry was trained in a conservatory before he began his musical career as The Flock's roadie and subsequently as a violinist.

After his 1971 appearance on John McLaughlin's album My Goal's Beyond, he became a member of McLaughlin's original Mahavishnu Orchestra lineup until the band broke up in 1973, and was viewed as a soloist of equal virtuosity to McLaughlin, keyboardist Jan Hammer and drummer Billy Cobham.

In 1974, after Mahavishnu, Goodman released the album Like Children with Mahavishnu keyboard alumnus Jan Hammer. Starting in 1985 he recorded three solo albums for Private Music -- On the Future of Aviation, Ariel, and the live album It's Alive with collaborators including Fred Simon and Jim Hines—and went on tour with his own band, as well as with Shadowfax and The Dixie Dregs. He scored Lily Tomlin's The Search for Signs of Intelligent Life in the Universe and is the featured violinist on numerous film soundtracks, including Billy Crystal's Mr. Saturday Night and Steve Martin's Dirty Rotten Scoundrels. His violin can be heard on more than fifty albums from artists ranging from Toots Thielemans to Hall & Oates to Styx to Jordan Rudess to Choking Ghost to Derek Sherinian. Goodman has appeared on four of Sherinian's solo records - Inertia (2001), Black Utopia (2003), Mythology (2004), and Blood of the Snake (2006)

In 1993, Goodman joined the American instrumental band, The Dixie Dregs, fronted by guitarist Steve Morse.  Goodman appeared on one studio recording Full Circle (1994), and the live album "California Screamin'" (2000).  In 1996 Session violist and producer Ray Tischer featured Goodman on the award-winning CD Canciones del Sol/Britt Bossa Orchestra (band) on Tischer's original instrumental Toca del Angel.

After an absence from the public eye in live concert, he toured in 2004 and 2005 with Gary Husband in his group Gary Husband’s Force Majeure, and appeared on the DVD Gary Husband's Force Majeure - Live at the Queen Elizabeth Hall. Even more recently, he played with the San Diego-based fusion group Hectic Watermelon and with Dream Theater in their album Black Clouds & Silver Linings. Goodman has also been a part of Billy Cobham's Spectrum 40 tour.

Discography

As leader
 1985 - On the Future of Aviation
 1986 - Ariel
 1987 - It's Alive
 2016 - Violin Fantasy

With The Flock
 1969 - The Flock
 1970 - Dinosaur Swamps

With Mahavishnu Orchestra 1971–1974: First incarnation: Jerry Goodman, John McLaughlin, Jan Hammer, Rick Laird, Billy Cobham 
 1971 - The Inner Mounting Flame
 1973 - Birds of Fire
 1973 - Between Nothingness and Eternity
 1980 - The Best of Mahavishnu Orchestra
 1999 - The Lost Trident Sessions 
 2011 - Unreleased Tracks from Between Nothingness & Eternity

With Jan Hammer
 1974 - Like Children

With John McLaughlin
 1971 - My Goal's Beyond
 1979 - Electric Guitarist

With Dixie Dregs
 1994 - Full Circle
 2000 - California ScreaminWith Howard Levy, Oteil Burbridge, and Steve Smith 1999 - The Stranger's HandAs a guest artist'''
 1992 - Dave Uhrich by Dave Uhrich
 1994 - Fret-no-tized by Dave Uhrich
 1994 - El Nervio del Volcan by Caifanes
 1995 - Canciones del Sol violinist Ray Tischer's the Britt Bossa Orchestra
 1998 - Standing 8 with Choking Ghost 1999 - Encores, Legends & Paradox, A Tribute To The Music OF ELP - Various Artists - (Jerry Goodman, Peter Banks, Igor Khoroshev, John Wetton, Simon Phillips, Robert Berry, Marc Bonilla, Jordan Rudess) Magna Carta – MAX-9026-2 
 1999 - Brave New World by Styx 
 2001 - Amazing Ordinary Things by Anne McCue
 2005 - Visions Of An Inner Mounting Apocalypse: A Fusion Guitar Tribute - Tone Center – TC 40402
 2007 - School of the Arts – School of the Arts (featuring T Lavitz, Steve Morse, Frank Gambale, Dave Weckl, John Patitucci) Goodman contributes violin work on 3 tracks, "No Time Flat" "Like This" and "Dinosaur Dance"
 2009 - Black Clouds & Silver Linings by Dream Theater
 2009 - A Tribute To Zbigniew Seifert - Jarek Śmietana Band (featuring Mateusz Smoczyński, Didier Lockwood, Krzesimir Dębski, Christian Howes, Mark Feldman, Maciej Strzelczyk, Adam Bałdych, Pierre Blanchard: JSR Records – JSR 0011)
 2018 - Strat Andriotis - Night Manager 2019 - 1000 Hands: Chapter One - Jon Anderson
 2020 - Strat Andriotis - Remember Me At Twilight 2021 - Denis Krupin - Path To LightMultimedia

Sources & external Links
 Mahavishnu Orchestra The Inner Mounting Flame CD booklet
 Mahavishnu Orchestra The Lost Trident Sessions'' CD booklet
 [ All Music Guide to Jerry Goodman]
 2010 interview with Jerry Goodman on Prog Sphere

References 

American rock violinists
American male violinists
American jazz violinists
Dixie Dregs members
Mahavishnu Orchestra members
Living people
1949 births
Musicians from Chicago
Private Music artists
Jazz musicians from Illinois
21st-century American violinists
21st-century American male musicians
American male jazz musicians
Shadowfax (band) members